DJ Maxi Jazz release The Soul Food Cafe System in 1984, having discovered hip hop a year earlier.

In 1989 DJ Maxi Jazz was picked up by Tam Tam Records, which is the dance wing of Savage Records), and the album Original Groovejuice, Vol. 1 was recorded.

Track list
 Oh No Ya Don't
 Brixton (Baby)
 SW2
 Slow Down
 Like A Sage
 Crumble
 Summertime
 Inner City Blues
 Better Out Than In
 Grab The Mic
 Macbeth Act IV Scene II
 This Is It
 Roll Credits

References

1996 albums